Dioryctria clarioralis, the blister coneworm moth, is a moth of the  family Pyralidae. It is found in the eastern United States, including Florida, New Jersey and Virginia.

The larvae feed on various Pinus species, including Pinus palustris. They have been reported attacking the flower cluster and shoots of their host plant.

Gallery

References

Moths described in 1863
clarioralis